Mariah is a variation of the feminine name Maria.
Its use in an English-language context suggests the pronunciation /məˈraɪə/, i.e. the traditional English pronunciation of Latin Maria (as opposed to the Spanish/Italian pronunciation now also commonly encountered in English).

The name was rarely given in the United States prior to the 1990s, when it rose in popularity from rank 562 in 1989 to rank 62 in 1998, in imitation of the name of singer Mariah Carey (whose single "Vision of Love" topped the charts in 1990).

People
Mariah Angeliq (b. 1999), American singer
Mariah Buzolin (b. 1991), Brazilian actress
Mariah Bell (b. 1996), American figure skater
Mariah Carey (b. 1969), American singer and songwriter
Mariah Paris Balenciaga (b. 1982), American drag queen and television personality

Pseudonyms 

Mariah Fredericks, author of bestselling fiction books for teens
Mariah Stewart, author of romantic fiction
 Mariah Sensuel, stage name of Finnish erotic actress Maria Kekkonen

Fictional characters 

Mariah (JoJo's Bizarre Adventure), a fictional character from the manga JoJo's Bizarre Adventure
Mariah Wong, a fictional character from the anime and manga series Beyblade

English feminine given names